Ralph Hammonds (July 9, 1906 – May 5, 1966) was an American wrestler. He competed in the men's freestyle middleweight at the 1928 Summer Olympics.

References

1906 births
1966 deaths
American male sport wrestlers
Olympic wrestlers of the United States
Wrestlers at the 1928 Summer Olympics
Sportspeople from Lawton, Oklahoma